Iron Soldier 3 is an open world first-person mecha simulation video game developed by Eclipse Software Design and originally published by Vatical Entertainment for the PlayStation on 20 June 2000 and was ported to the Nuon in 2001. A sequel to Iron Soldier 2, it is the third and last installment of the Iron Soldier series.

Set after the events of the second game, players assume the role of an elite defense pilot taking control of the titular mech in order to complete tasks and protect areas that conforms the United Republic from attacks of the returning PENTA corporation. Iron Soldier 3 was conceived after release of the second entry and originally intended to be an exclusive first-party title by Sony Computer Entertainment for the PlayStation before the deal was cancelled, leading to both Vatical Entertainment and Telegames handling publishing duties instead while VM Labs published the Nuon port, with the two versions featuring various differences. Versions for PlayStation 2 and Xbox were in development but not released.

Iron Soldier 3 garnered mixed reception from critics and reviewers since its initial release on the PlayStation and later on Nuon, with many feeling divided in regards to several aspects such as the visuals, audio, presentation and gameplay, which was deemed by some as sluggish and comparing with other titles in the same genre such as Armored Core and Gungriffon.

Gameplay 

Iron Soldier 3 is a mech simulation game with free-roaming elements that is primarily played in a first-person perspective like its predecessors, where the player controls a  robot to defend the United Republic, one of the last free countries left in a futuristic world from PENTA Industries, a large corporation that became powerful with the rapid industrialization of the world. There are several weapons to be found through the game such as machine guns, missiles, grenades and a flamethrower, among others to be collected and use. In addition to the standard titular robot, the player can pilot new mechs such as a smaller but faster chicken-walker type robot and a slower but more heavily armed walker. New gameplay modes have been added since Iron Soldier 2; although a single player campaign mode with 25 missions to complete was still included, there is also an arcade mode where the objective is to level every building in the area in the fastest time possible, in addition of a two-player mode.

Development 

After Iron Soldier 2 was launched for the Atari Jaguar and Atari Jaguar CD, Eclipse Software Design founder Marc Rosocha began conversations with Sony Computer Entertainment in regards of developing for the PlayStation while former Atari Corporation vice president in third-party development Bill Rehbock, who was now part of Sony, managed to send development kits to Eclipse Software. Rosocha stated that Eclipse was very close in obtaining a deal to publish Iron Soldier 3 as a first-party title but said deal was cancelled at the last minute, leading to the company signing another deal with both Vatical Entertainment and Telegames instead to handle publishing duties on PlayStation while a conversion for the Nuon was developed for VM Labs as well, which was overseen by former Atari Corp. employee Joe Sousa as its producer. When developing the project, Rosocha and his team wanted to retain the series' established core gameplay and mechanics from the Jaguar that led criticism from reviewers for being slow. The title made use of a proprietary game engine that featured several advanced special effects not commonly seen on PlayStation. The CGI cutscenes were created by Johannes Graf, who would later go on to develop Sturmwind for Dreamcast.

Release 
Iron Soldier 3 was first launched for the PlayStation in North America by Vatical Entertainment on 20 June 2000. Telegames published a re-release of the game, and also published it in Europe. The game was published for the Nuon by VM Labs in 2001 as one of the eight games for the platform, but it was recalled at one point due to incompatibility with some DVD players, leading to the publisher releasing an estimated low run of demo discs being sent to the userbase of the system. This version of the game features improved visuals and audio compared to the original PlayStation version, as well as other changes and additions. Once the game was published in western regions, Eclipse was approached by a Japanese publisher to localize the game in the region, however, Rosocha declined the offer due to the proposed decision of making it play faster and enable mechs to fly. A new version of the game titled Iron Soldier 3+ was in development for the PlayStation 2 and Xbox but it was cancelled. In 2020, indie publisher Songbird Productions announced a 2021 re-release of the Nuon port limited to 100 copies.

Reception 

Iron Soldier 3 received mixed reception since its release. The PlayStation version held a 61% on the video game review aggregator GameRankings. AllGames Nick Woods praised the audiovisual presentation, cooperative arcade mode, multiplayer, weapon variety and addictive gameplay but regarded the action to be repetitive. Nevertheless, Woods stated that the game is fun and "will no doubt please many people, including fans of the giant robot simulation genre". GameSpots Miguel Lopez criticized the rough visual presentation, audio and selection of weapons but commended the controls and CGI cutscenes. Lopez regarded the title as a first-person version of Rampage but recommended playing other similar games instead. IGNs David Smith stated that it does not compare with Gungriffon on Sega Saturn but gave positive remarks to the graphics and 3D engine for being faithful to previous entries on the Atari Jaguar while improving visual detail and framerate. Smith commended the controls, mission variety and selectable robots but regarded its multiplayer mode as "a bit of a toss-up." MAN!ACs David Mohr commented positively about the action, presentation and multiplayer but criticized the level of strategy.

PSM stated that Iron Soldier 3 came across as "ugly, slow and uninspired." Mega Funs Georg Döller commended the audiovisual presentation but stated that the game ultimately becomes monotonous despite the inclusion of a versus multiplayer mode and "cannot deliver what it promises in anyway." Video Games Alexander Olma compared the title with other PlayStation releases of similar style such as Ghost in the Shell and Krazy Ivan but criticized the visuals, audio, controls and multiplayer mode, stating that "the game does not reach the Front Mission 3 class." The Electric Playgrounds Mandip Sandhu also compared it concept-wise with Armored Core, criticizing the two other selectable mechs aside from the main Iron Soldier unit for being useless, both multiplayer modes and overall playability. Sandhu praised the CGI sequences and audio design but nevertheless recommended playing Armored Core and MechWarrior. In contrast, Play The PlayStations Martin Weidner praised the 3D graphics, visual effects, destructible environments, level design and controls but noted the high difficulty curve in various missions.

References

External links 
 
 Iron Soldier 3 at MobyGames
 Iron Soldier 3 at Telegames

2000 video games
Cancelled PlayStation 2 games
Cancelled Xbox games
Cooperative video games
DVD interactive technology
Eclipse Software Design games
Vatical Entertainment games
First-person shooters
Video games about mecha
Multiplayer and single-player video games
PlayStation (console) games
Video games developed in Germany
Video game sequels
Video games set in the future
Telegames games